Huang Kun-huei (born 8 November 1936) is a Taiwanese politician. A former member of the Kuomintang, he had served as the party's secretary general from 1999 to 2000. Prior to that, Huang served as the minister of the Mainland Affairs Council from 1991 to 1994 and Minister of the Interior from 1994 to 1996. He later left the KMT and joined the Taiwan Solidarity Union, chairing the TSU from 2007 to 2016.

TSU Chairmanship
Huang was elected leader of the Taiwan Solidarity Union on 19 January 2007.

Cross-Straits Economic Trade and Culture Forum
Huang stated in October 2013 that the Cross-Straits Economic Trade and Culture Forum that have been going on between the Kuomintang (KMT) and the Communist Party of China (CPC), has shown nothing to Taiwan, except how the high-ranking KMT officials fawn over Beijing for personal gain, either financially or politically. The forum has become the platform for the KMT to collaborate with the CPC in containing Taiwan. The Cross-Strait Service Trade Agreement had become a tool in which the government of China pressured Ma Ying-jeou's administration.

Huang resigned his post shortly after the TSU failed to win any legislative seats in the 2016 elections.

References

Taiwan Solidarity Union chairpersons
Living people
1936 births
Taiwanese Ministers of the Interior
University of Northern Colorado alumni
National Taiwan Normal University alumni